Warhammer: Invasion is a Living Card Game (LCG) (variant of collectible card game) designed by Eric M. Lang and produced by Fantasy Flight Games in 2009, set in the Warhammer Fantasy universe. Like Fantasy Flight's other LCGs, Invasion is sold as a core set, which can be played on its own, or built upon with expansion packs. Each pack has a fixed set of 3 copies each of 20 cards. There are six factions in Invasion: Dwarves, Empire, Orcs, Chaos, High Elves, and Dark Elves. The first four have decks in the core set, while the elves' decks are available in the Assault on Ulthuan expansion.

Each player has a board called a "capital", which is divided into 3 zones: Battlefield, Quest, and Kingdom. The Battlefield is the area where attacks are launched, Quest determines how many cards are drawn each turn, and Kingdom determines how many resources are gathered each turn. Resources are spent to play cards. Each unit has a power rating that adds to the zone they are played into. For example, a unit with a power of 2 would add 2 damage to attacks when played into the Battlefield, 2 additional resources per turn if played into the Kingdom, or 2 additional cards drawn if played into the Quest zone.

Each zone has a base defense of 8, which may be modified with cards. A zone's defense may be lowered by damaging it, usually by attacking from the Battlefield. Once a zone's defense is at or below zero, that zone is destroyed. (The player can still use it as normal, but it is marked with a "burning" token.) The player who succeeds at destroying at least two of their opponent's zones wins the game.

The Cataclysm expansion added a multiplayer mode to the game, and the Hidden Kingdoms expansion introduced four new factions, with their own capitals: Lizardmen, Wood Elves, Skaven, and Undead. Fantasy Flight has announced that Hidden Kingdoms will be the last expansion for the game.

List of Expansions

Battle Packs

Battle packs are released in "cycles" of six. Each pack contains three copies of 20 cards. (The Corruption Cycle, however, was printed under a different format, so each pack has three copies of 10 cards and one copy of 10 other cards.)

The Corruption Cycle

The Enemy Cycle

The Morrslieb Cycle

The Capital Cycle

The Bloodquest Cycle

The Eternal War Cycle

Deluxe Expansions
Deluxe expansions add new elements to the game, including new card types, rules, etc.  All deluxe expansion provide three copies of each unique card, except for Assault on Ulthuan, which contains 1, 2, or 3 copies of each card, similar to the core set.

References

External links
 
 Warhammer: Invasion at FantasyFlightGames.com

Warhammer Fantasy
Card games introduced in 2009
Fantasy Flight Games games
Dedicated deck card games
Eric M. Lang games